In enzymology, a 4-(cytidine 5'-diphospho)-2-C-methyl-D-erythritol kinase is an enzyme that catalyzes the chemical reaction

ATP + 4-diphosphocytidyl-2-C-methyl-D-erythritol 2-phosphate  ADP + 4-diphosphocytidyl-2-C-methyl-D-erythritol 2-phosphate

Thus, the two substrates of this enzyme are ATP and 4-diphosphocytidyl-2-C-methyl-D-erythritol 2-phosphate (CDP-ME), whereas its two products are ADP and 4-diphosphocytidyl-2-C-methyl-D-erythritol 2-phosphate (CDP-MEP).

This enzyme belongs to the family of transferases, specifically those transferring phosphorus-containing groups (phosphotransferases) with an alcohol group as acceptor.  The systematic name of this enzyme class is ATP:4-(cytidine 5'-diphospho)-2-C-methyl-D-erythritol 2-phosphotransferase. This enzyme is also called CDP-ME kinase, and IspE.  This enzyme participates in the MEP pathway (non-mevalonate pathway) of isoprenoid precursor biosynthesis.

Structural studies

References

 
 

EC 2.7.1
Enzymes of known structure